Mooresville High School is a public high school located in Mooresville, Indiana.

Mooresville was the first high school in central Indiana, built in 1861 as a subscription high school with students from as far away as Iowa boarding with local residents to attend school.  The expense of operating the school was met by charging a tuition fee. In the first year, the school operated during a fall session at a cost of $11 and a spring session at a cost of $9. Beginning in the fall of 1862, the school held three sessions each year at a cost of $7.50 for each pupil enrolled for each session. Students who lived outside Mooresville boarded with local families at a cost of $1.50 to $2 per week.

The community of Mooresville is located southwest of Indianapolis, Indiana. The school district includes the Town of Mooresville as well as Brown Township, Madison Township, and Harrison Township.

As of 2015, about 1,450 students attend Mooresville High School in grades 9-12.

Honors and recognition 
In 2005, Mooresville was the first high school to win the national State Farm Project Ignition Teen Safe Driving Program.

In 2006, the school's Junior State of America was honored as the JSA National Chapter of the Year by receiving the National Civic Impact award. The chapter continues to receive recognition at the state and national level.

Mooresville's marching band, the Pioneer Regiment, has consistently placed in the "Sweet 16" of the Indiana State Fair Band Day competition.

Notable alumni
Mooresville High School has had several graduates go on to prestigious careers, including:

 Sammy Lee Davis, Medal of Honor recipient - Davis is known at The "Real" Forrest Gump as parts of his Vietnam story and footage for his Medal of Honor ceremony were utilized in the Forrest Gump movie.
 Tim Franklin, distinguished journalist - Franklin has a Nobel prize jurist; managing editor of Bloomberg News: past editor at the Indianapolis Star, the Orlando Sentinel, and the Baltimore Sun; and currently serves as the president of The Poynter Institute.
 Joseph Van Bokkelen, federal judge - Van Bokkelen serves as a judge in the United States District Court for the Northern District of Indiana.
 William G. Bray, United States Representative - Bray served the U.S. House of Representatives from 1951-1967.
 Clifford C. Furnas, Olympian - Furnas was an American author, Olympic athlete, scientist, expert on guided missiles, university president, and public servant.
 Stu O’Dell, former football linebacker for the then Washington Redskins, and Baltimore Colts. Playing in 39 games between 1974 and 1978.

See also
 List of high schools in Indiana

References

External links
 Official Website

Buildings and structures in Morgan County, Indiana
Public high schools in Indiana
Education in Morgan County, Indiana
1861 establishments in Indiana